The following lists events that happened during 2014 in Cameroon.

Incumbents
 President: Paul Biya
 Prime Minister: Philémon Yang

Events

February
 February 16 - Suspected Islamist militants kill 90 people in a Nigerian village raid near the border with Cameroon.

April
 April 5 - Two Italian priests and a Canadian nun have been kidnapped by gunmen in Cameroon.

May
 May 17 - Nigeria, Niger, Cameroon, Benin, and Chad join together to combat Boko Haram.

June
 June 1 - The two Italian priests and a Canadian nun kidnapped by suspected Boko Haram gunmen have been released.

December
 December 28 - The militant organisation Boko Haram attacks a village in Northern Cameroon, leaving an estimated 30 dead.
 December 29 - Cameroon launches its first airstrikes against Boko Haram in a successful operation to reclaim several villages and a military base briefly seized by the militant group in the Far North Region.

References

 
2010s in Cameroon
Years of the 21st century in Cameroon
Cameroon
Cameroon